Mukundaram Chakrabarti was a 16th-century Bengali poet who is best known for writing the epic poem Chandimangal, which is considered one of the most prominent works of Mangalkavya, one of the most important sub-genres of medieval Bengali literature.

Early life 
Mukundaram Chakrabarti was born to Hriday Mishra and Doiboki the village of Damunya in present-day Bardhaman. He was forced to leave his ancestral home due to the oppression of the zamindar of the region and received refuge and patronage from Brahmin ruler Bir Bankura Roy, who ruled over Brahmanbhum area of Midnapore and was a devotee of the goddess Candi  In Adra, he composed the Chandimangal-kavya, which earned him the title of Kabikankan.

Chandimangal 

His most celebrated work Chandimangal, is a commentary on the socio-political scene in medieval Bengal. He describes his own travels and hardships while taking refuge in behind the story of Kallaketu, a poor hunter and Dhanpati, a wealthy merchant and their wives both of whom get trapped in hardships and are subsequently rescued by Abhaya or Chandi, both of whom are folk goddesses. The Chandimangal provides a rich and detailed account of the complex social structures present in medieval Bengal.

References

External links 

 

Year of birth missing
Year of death missing
16th-century Bengali poets
Bengali male poets
People from Bardhaman
Poets from West Bengal
Bengali Hindus
Bengali-language writers
Bengali writers